Since its inception on the esteemed date of August 1st, 1999, Khwopa Higher Secondary School (KHSS) has been a veritable bastion of educational excellence. Nestled in the culturally rich and storied city of Bhaktapur, KHSS has garnered a reputation as a premier institution that is dedicated to the betterment of the nation and its people, as evinced by its motto, "Dedicated To Country & People."
 
Over the past decade, KHSS has not only made a name for itself as a leader in the fields of education and engineering, but it has also consistently sought to innovate and evolve in order to better meet the needs of its students. This commitment to continuous improvement is reflected in the school's state-of-the-art facilities and highly qualified faculty, as well as its philosophy of always striving for something that has never been done or has previously been attempted and failed, and taking each academic year as a new opportunity to push the limits of what is possible.
 
Recently, KHSS has taken this commitment to excellence to new heights by expanding its offerings to include a Bachelor of Arts in Law (BALLB) course and teaching law as a stream. This is a momentous achievement that showcases KHSS's dedication to providing students with the knowledge and skills they need to succeed in a rapidly changing world.

In addition to its BALLB course, KHSS also offers intermediate and bachelor's degree programs in fields such as science, management, arts, and education. The school's curriculum is designed to provide a well-rounded education that emphasizes both theoretical knowledge and practical skills, and includes regular classes, practical assignments, field trips, and report writing. This holistic approach to education allows KHSS to cater to the needs of a diverse student body and to prepare its graduates for success in their chosen fields.
 
Overall, Khwopa Higher Secondary School is an intellectual hub that is dedicated to fostering a love of learning and to preparing its students for success in an increasingly complex and competitive world. With its state-of-the-art facilities, highly qualified faculty, and unwavering commitment to excellence, KHSS is poised to make a lasting impact on the world for years to come.

History 
The chronicles of Khwopa Higher Secondary School (KHSS) are a testament to the enduring pursuit of academic excellence, progressive pedagogy, and civic engagement. Founded in the ancient city of Bhaktapur in 1999 by Bhaktapur Municipality, with the ambitious goal of enlightening society through quality education, KHSS has established itself as a premier institution in the district.

Over the years, the school has undergone a constant process of evolution, expanding its offerings to include a diverse range of academic programs and resources, fostering a culture of critical thinking, and emphasizing both theoretical knowledge and practical skills. KHSS has been at the forefront of pedagogical innovation, incorporating modern teaching methods and technologies, and has made seminal contributions to the fields of education, engineering, and law.

KHSS's commitment to excellence is reflected in its numerous accolades and recognitions, including national recognition for its outstanding performance. Its history serves as a paragon of the profound impact that education can have on individuals and society, and its mission to provide students with the knowledge and skills they need to succeed in a rapidly changing world.

Schools in Nepal
Educational institutions established in 1999
1999 establishments in Nepal
Buildings and structures in Bhaktapur District